Arley Betancourth (born 4 March 1975) is a Colombian former footballer who played as a forward. He made nine appearances for the Colombia national team from 1994 to 1999. He was also part of Colombia's squad for the 1999 Copa América tournament.

References

External links
 

1975 births
Living people
Sportspeople from Valle del Cauca Department
Colombian footballers
Association football forwards
Colombia international footballers
Deportivo Cali footballers
Club Atlético Lanús footballers
América de Cali footballers
UA Maracaibo players
Deportivo Pereira footballers
Deportes Quindío footballers
C.D. Universidad Católica del Ecuador footballers
Colombian expatriate footballers
Expatriate footballers in Argentina
Colombian expatriate sportspeople in Argentina
Expatriate footballers in Venezuela
Colombian expatriate sportspeople in Venezuela
Expatriate footballers in Ecuador
Colombian expatriate sportspeople in Ecuador
Footballers at the 1995 Pan American Games
Pan American Games bronze medalists for Colombia
Pan American Games medalists in football
Medalists at the 1995 Pan American Games